The Sree Sankaracharya University of Sanskrit (SSUS) is a Sanskrit university in India established in 1993 in Kalady, Kerala. It provides education in Sanskrit, other Indian and Foreign languages, Social science and fine arts. It is accredited A+ by National Assessment and Accreditation Council (NAAC). The university has eight regional campuses across Kerala.

Campus
The university functions through nine regional centres, namely Kalady (main campus), Thiruvananthapuram, Panmana, Thuravoor, Ettumanoor, Tirur, Koyilandy and Payyannur. Most of these campuses are located in rural areas of the State, intending to serve people from disadvantaged backgrounds. More than ninety percent of the students and research scholars in the University are from economically and socially backward communities and families and more than seventy percent are women.

Organisation and administration

Departments
The university consists of the following departments.
 Sanskrit Vedanta
 Sanskrit Sahitya
 Sanskrit Vyakarna
 Sanskrit Nyaya
 Sanskrit General
 English
 Geography
 Hindi
 History
 Malayalam
 Music
 Painting
 Philosophy
 Political Science
 Psychology
 Arabic
 Ayurveda
 Economics
 Dance
 Education
 School of Vedic Studies
 Social Work
 Sociology
 Theatre
 Urdu
 Vastuvidya

Academics

Academic programmes
The university has twenty six PhD programmes, twenty MPhil programmes, twenty four PG programmes , ten UG programmes, two PgD programmes, one Diploma programme and nine certificate programmes offered by the twenty-four academic departments. The Choice Based Credit and Semester System (CBCSS) was introduced in 2005 in SSUS. In 2018, the University implemented the system of Outcome Based Teaching, Learning and Evaluation (OBTLE) at the Post graduate level, becoming the first university in Kerala to introduce OBTLE. In 2021, the university becomes a part of KALNET, a shared platform for academic resources of libraries, developed by Kerala State Higher Education Council. The university's postgraduate programme in Museology will be launched in 2021.

Accreditation
The University Grants Commission has recognized the university with 2(f) status in 1994 and 12(B) status in 2005. On 31st August 2021, the university was accredited by NAAC with A+ grade, the first University in Kerala and the first Sanskrit University in the country to earn the achievement. In September 2014, the university was accredited by NAAC with A grade, the first University in Kerala to receive the grade in the first cycle of accreditation.

Notable alumni

 Surabhi Lakshmi is a National Film Award winning Malayalam movie actress.
 Dileesh Pothan well-known film director, actor and producer in Malayalam cinema.
 Arun Muraleedharan a  Malayalam film music Composer.
 Grace Antony, film Actress
 V. P. Sanu politician currently serving as national president of Students' Federation of India
 Renu Soundar, Malayalam film and television series actress. 
 Hima Shankar, Film and theatre artist
 Sneha Sreekumar is an Indian actress and dancer who appears in Malayalam films, television serials and theatre dramas. 
 Vijilesh Karayad, a Malayalam film actor.
 M. Vijin currently serving as MLA of Kalliasseri constituency and state vice president of DYFI, Kerala State Committee. He was former SFI All India Joint Secretary.
 Shobhana

Notable faculty

Sunil P. Ilayidom, associate professor at Malayalam department
G. Gangadharan Nair, former professor

Campus

See also
 Adi Shankara
 Sree Sankara College

References

External links

 Official website of the university
 University Library
 Online Public Access Catalogue

 
Sanskrit universities in India
1993 establishments in Kerala
Educational institutions established in 1993
Universities in Kochi